The Old Reid Hospital was a building in Richmond, Indiana that previously housed Reid Hospital and Health Care Services.  The hospital was founded in 1905 by Daniel Grey Reid.  The building was demolished in late 2018.

History 
The lack of adequate medical care at this time required many patients in Richmond to be treated in their own homes. Daniel Grey Reid lost both his wife, Ella, and son, Frank, who died before the hospital's construction.  The hospital's dedication ceremony took place on July 27, 1905.

References

External links 
 Video of Old Reid after closing

Hospitals in Indiana
Buildings and structures in Richmond, Indiana